Assück was an American grindcore band from Saint Petersburg, Florida, active from 1987 to 1998.

History 
Assück was founded by vocalist Paul Pavlovich and guitarist Steve Heritage. The band went through several line-up changes, in particular changing vocalists four times. Despite these changes, Assück maintained its heavy and fast sound — and anarchist sensibilities — from its first release to its last.

Legacy and reception 
The band proved influential, with their album Anticapital (1991) voted number 4 in the Terrorizer list of their top 20 US grindcore albums; Terrorizer described it as a "low-calibre battery of brooding, malicious, doom-ridden grind pitched somewhere between early Napalm Death and even earlier Bolt Thrower".

According to journalist Greg Pratt, "Assück were an incredible band with probably metal's best drummer [Rob Proctor], although no one ever mentions his name. They combined well-written poetic and political lyrics with catchy songs, insane musicianship and a short-fast-loud brutality that no one has topped since."

Writing for Maximumrocknroll, Felix von Havoc describes the political punk and metal roots of this band, stating "Assuck managed to combine the anger, fury and social commentary of a punk band with the musicianship and production quality of a Death Metal band."

Members
Final line-up
 Steve Heritage - guitar, vocals (1987-1998)
 Jason Crittendon - bass (1998)
 Rob Proctor - drums (1987-1998)

Former members
 Paul Pavlovich - vocals (1987-1993)
 Dave "Spinach" Malinksky - vocals (1994-1995)
 Daryl Kahan - vocals (1993-1994)
 Pete Jay - bass (1991-1992)
 Steve Kosiba - bass (1992-1998)

Timeline

Discography
Studio albums
 Anticapital (1991, Sound Pollution)
 Misery Index (1997, Sound Pollution)

Extended plays
 Born Backwards demo tape (1989, Liquified Tapes)
 Necrosalvation 7-inch (1990, Rigid Records)
 Split 7-inch with Old Lady Drivers (1990, No System)
 Blindspot 7-inch (1992, Open Records)
 State To State 7-inch (1992, SOA)

Compilation albums
 Anticapital/Blindspot +3 (1994, Sound Pollution)

References

External links

 Assück biography @ MusicMight
 Discogs page

American grindcore musical groups
Death metal musical groups from Florida
Musical groups established in 1987
Musical groups disestablished in 1998
Deathgrind musical groups
Political music groups
American musical trios